North Seaton railway station served the town of Ashington, Northumberland, England from 1859 to 1964 on the Blyth and Tyne Railway.

History 
The station opened on 7 November 1859 by the Blyth and Tyne Railway. It was situated on the north side of the level crossing on Blackclose Bank on the A196, 100 yards west of the junction with the B1334. North Seaton Colliery opened a mile south east of the station in the 1860s and a mining village of the same name was spawned soon after. The station was closed to goods traffic on 9 December 1963 and closed to passengers on 2 November 1964.

References

External links 

Disused railway stations in Northumberland
Former North Eastern Railway (UK) stations
Railway stations in Great Britain opened in 1859
Railway stations in Great Britain closed in 1964
1859 establishments in England
1964 disestablishments in England
Beeching closures in England
Ashington